Joseph or Joe Robertson may refer to:

Sportsmen
 Joe Robertson (footballer) (born 1977), Scottish footballer
 Joe Robertson (ice hockey) (born 1948), Canadian hockey player

Others
Joseph Robertson (priest) (1726–1802), English clergyman and writer
Joseph Robertson (pastor) (1849–1921), Australian Congregationalist minister
Joseph Clinton Robertson (c. 1787–1852), pseudonym Sholto Percy, Scottish patent agent and periodical editor
Joseph Robertson (historian) (1810–1866), Scottish scholar
Joseph Robertson (OHSU), president of Oregon Health & Science University
Joseph Gibb Robertson (1820–1899), Scottish-born merchant, farmer and political figure in Quebec
Robbie Robertson (comics), a fictional character in the Spider-Man series